John Mark Slack Jr. (March 18, 1915 – March 17, 1980) was an American politician from West Virginia.  He was a Democrat.

Slack was born in Charleston, where he attended the public schools. He later studied at the Virginia Military Institute in Lexington, Virginia.

Slack's public service career began in 1948, when he became a member of Kanawha County Court, where he sat until 1952. He subsequently served as Kanawha County Assessor from 1952 to 1958.

When three-term 6th district Representative Robert Byrd decided against seeking re-election in order to run for the U.S. Senate, Slack won the Democratic nomination and was easily elected that November. He went on to be re-elected 11 times, never facing serious opposition. His district was renumbered as the 3rd District in 1963, after West Virginia lost a district as a result of the 1960 Census. Slack voted in favor of the Civil Rights Acts of 1960, 1964, and 1968, and the Voting Rights Act of 1965.

Slack served until his death of a heart attack in Alexandria, Virginia on March 17, 1980. He was replaced by John G. Hutchinson, then mayor of Charleston, after a special election, who served until the end of the term. He was interred in Cunningham Memorial Park, St. Albans, West Virginia.

See also
 List of United States Congress members who died in office (1950–99)

References

External links

1915 births
1980 deaths
County commissioners in West Virginia
Politicians from Charleston, West Virginia
Virginia Military Institute alumni
Democratic Party members of the United States House of Representatives from West Virginia
20th-century American politicians
County assessors in the United States